Porte d'Italie is a station of the Paris Métro, serving Line 7 and Tramway Line 3a.

The station opened on 7 March 1930 as part of Line 10 when it was extended from Place d'Italie to Porte de Choisy. The station was integrated into line 7 on 26 April 1931. In 2006, Paris Tramway Line 3 (now 3a) opened, with a stop at Porte d'Italie. It is named after the Porte d'Italie, a gate in the nineteenth century Thiers wall of Paris, which led to the south and Italy.

Station layout

Gallery

References

Paris Métro stations in the 13th arrondissement of Paris
Railway stations in France opened in 1930